Nicholas Read  is an American physicist, noted for his work on strongly interacting quantum many-body systems.

Biography
Read was born in Britain in 1958 and did his undergraduate education at Cambridge University. He completed his PhD at the Imperial College, London after which he moved to the United States. Read worked as a post-doctoral researcher, first at Brown University, and then at the Massachusetts Institute of Technology. He joined Yale University as an assistant professor in 1988, where he has been ever since.

Read's early work concerns understanding properties of rare-earth "heavy-fermion" compounds. Along with Greg Moore he developed the theory of non-abelian braiding statistics in quantum Hall systems.   He developed a theory of "composite fermions", which can be used to explain properties of free electron gas at high magnetic fields, in quantum hall liquids and half-filled Landau levels. Read was awarded the 2002 Oliver E. Buckley Condensed Matter Prize together with Jainendra Jain and Robert Willet "For theoretical and experimental work establishing the composite fermion model for the half-filled Landau level and other quantized Hall systems"

Honours
Shared the 2002 Oliver E. Buckley Condensed Matter Prize
Fellow of the American Physical Society
Member of the American Academy of Arts and Sciences
Shared the 2015 Dirac Medal of ICTP
Elected a Fellow of the Royal Society (FRS)

External links
Department page

References

1958 births
Living people
Oliver E. Buckley Condensed Matter Prize winners
Members of the United States National Academy of Sciences
Yale University faculty
Rare earth scientists
Fellows of the Royal Society
Fellows of the American Physical Society